This is a list of Ukrainian football transfers summer 2017. Only clubs in 2017–18 Ukrainian Premier League are included.

Ukrainian Premier League

Chornomorets Odesa

In:

Out:

Dynamo Kyiv

In:

Out:

Karpaty Lviv

In:

Out:

Mariupol

In:

Out:

Oleksandriya

In:

Out:

Olimpik Donetsk

In:

Out:

Shakhtar Donetsk

In:

Out:

Stal Kamianske

In:

Out:

Veres Rivne

In:

Out:

Vorskla Poltava

In:

Out:

Zirka Kropyvnytskyi

In:

Out:

Zorya Luhansk

In:

Out:

References

Ukraine
Transfers
2017